Bolivia is a live album by Argentinian jazz composer and saxophonist Gato Barbieri featuring performances recorded in New York in 1973 and first released on the Flying Dutchman label.

Reception

In Creem magazine, Robert Christgau gave Bolivia an "A−" and said he liked it slightly better than Barbieri's other 1973 album Chapter One: Latin America "because I prefer Lonnie Liston Smith and Barbieri's other Afro-American sidemen to his less disciplined all-South American band." The Allmusic site awarded the album 4 stars stating "Ultimately, Bolivia is a sensual, musically adept, and groundbreaking recording, which offered Barbieri a chance to come in from the avant-garde before heading back to the fringes with the Latin America series. A fine effort that is finally getting the notoriety it deserves".

Track listing
All compositions by Gato Barbieri except as indicated
 "Merceditas" – 9:07 	
 "Eclypse/Michellina" (Traditional/Barbieri) – 6:24 	
 "Bolivia" – 7:46 	
 "Niños" – 7:14 	
 "Vidala Triste" (Barbieri, Michelle Barbieri) – 5:30

Personnel
Gato Barbieri – tenor saxophone, flute, vocals
Lonnie Liston Smith – piano, electric piano
John Abercrombie – guitar, electric guitar
Jean-François Jenny-Clark – bass 
Stanley Clarke – electric bass  
Bernard Purdie – drums
Airto Moreira, Gene Golden, James Mtume, Moulay "Ali" Hafid – percussion

References

1973 live albums
Albums produced by Bob Thiele
Flying Dutchman Records live albums
Gato Barbieri live albums